Andrea Burk (born April 7, 1982) is a Canadian rugby footballer. She represented  in rugby union at the 2014 Women's Rugby World Cup and in rugby league at the 2017 Women's Rugby League World Cup.

Rugby
Burk started playing rugby in 1997, at the age of 15, with her local club Capilano RFC.

Since 2013, she has been on the Aptoella Angels Select Team.

Honors
 2004-2006 Canadian Interuniversity Sport All-Canadian
 2004-2006 Female Athlete of the Year - Acadia University
 2010 National Campion - Team BC
 2011 British Columbia - Female Player of the Year
 2014 Gillian Florence award
 2014 Women's Rugby World Cup Dream team
 2016 Player of the Year finalist

Personal
Burk has a Bachelor's degree in Kinesiology from Acadia University and a Master's degree in Leadership and Development from Royal Roads University.

From 2014-2016, Burke was the Director of the British Columbia Rugby Union Board of Directors and was on the National Women's Program Player's Committee from 2011 to 2014. She is also on the Monty Heald Fund committee.

References

External links
Official website

1982 births
Living people
Canadian female rugby union players
Canada women's international rugby union players
Canadian female rugby league players
Canada women's national rugby league team players